John P. Burr  (1831, Edinburgh – 1893, London) was a Scottish  oil and watercolour painter of genre scenes, portraits and landscapes.

At the age of fourteen John Burr began painting portraits of well-to-do people in small Scottish towns. After study at the Trustees' Academy in Edinburgh, Burr painted in Edinburgh until 1861. In that year he and his younger brother Alexander Hohenlohe Burr (1835–1899) established themselves as painters in London. John Burr first exhibited at the Royal Academy in 1862 and worked in London until 1892. During his career in London he exhibited 18 paintings at the Royal Academy, 1 at the British Institution, 3 at the Grosvenor Gallery, 35 at the Society of British Artists, 18 at the Royal Water Colour Society, and numerous paintings in other locations in London. He also exhibited in Edinburgh, Glasgow, Birmingham, Liverpool and Manchester. His works include The Peepshow and The 5th of November. Burr was elected in 1875 a member of the Society of British Artists and in 1883 a member of the Royal Institute of Oil Painters. He was president of the Society of British Artists from 1881 until May or June 1886 when he resigned.

References

External links

1831 births
1893 deaths
Scottish landscape painters
Alumni of the Edinburgh College of Art
19th-century Scottish painters
Scottish male painters
Members of the Royal Society of British Artists
19th-century Scottish male artists